The 14th Guards Army was a field army of the Red Army, the Soviet Ground Forces, and the Russian Ground Forces, active from 1956 to 1995. According to sources within the 14th Army, the majority of its troops came from what would become the Pridnestrovian Moldavian Soviet Socialist Republic, with 51% of officers and 79% of draftees coming from this region.

History

World War II and postwar period
The 14th Army was established on November 25, 1956 from the Odessa Military District's 10th Guards Budapest Rifle Corps in Chișinău. The rifle corps took part in the Dnieper–Carpathian Offensive as part of the 5th Shock Army and the Budapest Offensive as part of the 46th Army. After the war, units of the army such as the 33rd Guards Motorized Rifle Division were stationed in the Romanian People's Republic until they were withdrawn between 1958 and 1960. On November 3, 1967 the army was renamed the 14th Guards Combined Arms Army on the orders of Marshal of the Soviet Union Rodion Malinovsky. In August 1968, one of the army's divisions, the 48th Motor Rifle Division, took part in the Soviet-led invasion of Czechoslovakia (known as Operation Danube), joining the Central Group of Forces. The army was awarded the Order of the Red Banner on October 28, 1974 by the Presidium of the Supreme Soviet of the Soviet Union. It began to recruit Transnistrian youths for military service in the early 70s, which would later become the army's main ethnic majority. In the early 1980s, the headquarters was moved to Tiraspol, the capital of Soviet Transnistria. On April 1,1992, the President of Russia Boris Yeltsin ordered that the 14th Guards Combined Arms Army come under the jurisdiction of the Russian Army.

Involvement in the Transnistrian War
At the start of the Transnistrian War in March 1992, the Russian government adopted an official policy for neutrality. Despite this, many 14th Guards Army personnel were sympathetic to the creation of the PMR and therefore defected and joined Transnistrian units and participated in the fighting as part of the Armed Forces of Transnistria. Even its own commanding officer, General G. I. Yakovlev, defected to the Transnistrian side, eventually playing a role in the republic's founding and serving as a career politician. Once he accepted the position of Chairman of the Department of Defense PMR on December 3, 1991, Yevgeny Shaposhnikov (Commander-in-Chief of the CIS Armed Forces at the time) immediately and permanently relieved him of his Russian military service. The number of Russian personnel of the army located in the Republic of Moldova totaled about 14,000 soldiers (conscripts and officers), all of which were supported by 9,000 Transnistrian militiamen who were armed and trained by the 14th Guards Army. On June 23, Major General Alexander Lebed arrived at the headquarters 14th Army in the Transnistrian capital under the orders from the Russian Ground Forces to inspect the army and evacuate the weapons depot.

On close to two weeks later, in the early hours of July 3, Lebed ordered a massive artillery strike from the left bank of the Dniester onto a Moldovan contingent in Gerbovetskii forest (near Bender). This was considered to be the conflict's climax which ultimately resulted in the end of the conflict's military phase and the beginning of trilateral negotiations between Russia, Transnistria and Moldova.

Disbandment
After the war, the unit's number of personnel were reduced dramatically, with subordinate units were split between the Armed Forces of Ukraine and the Armed Forces of Russia. The units that remained were reformed into the Moscow Military District's Operational Group of Russian Forces in Moldova between April-June 1995. This was done at the behest of the General Staff of the Russian Armed Forces. It is generally accepted by the Military of Moldova and the Government of Transnistria that the 14th Army played a critical role in preventing the installation of Moldovan control in the area. Many veterans of the former Russian 14th Army were given local residence in and around Tiraspol.

Structure

1960-1989
When the army was four years old in 1960, the following divisions were assigned to it:

59th Guards Motor Rifle Division (Tiraspol)
86th Guards Motor Rifle Division (Balti)
88th Motor Rifle Division (Belgorod-Dnestrovsky)
118th Motor Rifle Division (Bolgrad)

In 1964, the 88th Motor Rifle Division became the 180th Motor Rifle Division, and the 118th Motor Rifle Division was redesignated as the 48th Motor Rifle Division.

1988
Source: Holm, 14th Guards Combined Arms Army.
59th Guards Motor Rifle Division (Tiraspol)
86th Guards Motor Rifle Division (Beltsy) - moved to Floreshty, Moldavian SSR, 1 December 1989. Taken over by Moldova reportedly in February 1992.
180th Motor Rifle Division (Belgorod-Dnestrovsky) - taken over by Ukraine in early 1992 (Holm).

1990-1992
As of November 19, 1990, the 14th Guards Army consisted of the units mentioned below:

 Army Headquarters (Tiraspol)
 173rd Missile Brigade (Bender)
 189th Guards Missile Brigade (Bălți): 
 156th Anti-Aircraft Missile Brigade (Ungheni)
 865th Air Defense Command Post
 4th Artillery Regiment (Ungheni)
 803rd Rocket Artillery Regiment (disbanded, assets to 4th Artillery Reg)
 2335th Reconnaissance Artillery Regiment (disbanded, assets to 4th Artillery Reg)
 714th Separate Reconnaissance Artillery Battalion (Ungheni)
 36th Separate Helicopter Squadron (Tirospol)
 321st Separate Squadron of Unmanned Reconnaissance Systems (Tiraspol)
 905th Air Assault Battalion (Tiraspol)
 194th Pontoon Bridge Regiment, 115th Separate Engineer Sapper Battalion (Parcani)
 15th Separate Signal Regiment (Tiraspol)
 108th Separate Radio Engineering Regiment (Bender)
 130th Chemical Defense Battalion, 785th NBC Reconnaissance Battalion (Bender)
 58th Radio Engineering Battalion, 976th and 2242nd Electronic Warfare Battalions (Bender)
 5381st Equipment Storage Base  (Floreşti) (former 86th Guards Motor Rifle Division)
 59th Guards Motor Rifle Division (Kramatorskaya) in (Tiraspol)
 5775th Base for Storage of Weapons and Equipment (Bilhorod-Dnistrovsky, Odessa Oblast) formerly the 180th Motor Rifle Division

By 1991, the army was made up of the 59th Guards Motor Rifle Division, two storage bases, and other smaller units, and the 1162nd Anti-Aircraft Rocket Regiment remaining.

Equipment
At its peak, the army utilized 229 tanks, 305 various armored vehicles, 328 artillery guns, mortars, and rocket launchers and 74 pieces of aviation transportation.

Vehicles
~60 T-64B
117 MT-LB
25 Р-R-145BM
2 RKhM Kashalot
3 UR-67
27 9M113 Konkurs
32 S-60
22 BTR-60
4 IRM

Artillery
36 D-30 howitzer
24 2A36 "Giatsint"
26 BM-27 Uragan
3 PRP-3
3 Klyon 1
2 1V19
5 R-145BM

Aircraft
2 Su-27
3 An-2
1 An-24
2 An-26
4 Yak-52
3 L-39 
8 Mi-8
4 Mi-2
2 Mi-24K
2 Mi-24R

Commanders of the Army

The following generals commanded the 14th Guards Army:

Lieutenant General Ivan Afonin (November 1956–May 1960)
Major General (promoted to Lieutenant General in May 1961) Grigory Shcherbak (May 1960–May 1969)
Lieutenant General Vladimir Meretskov (May 1969–November 1971)
Major General (promoted to Lieutenant General in November 1972) Grigory Yashkin (November 1971–December 1975)
Major General (promoted to Lieutenant General in October 1979) Vladimir Vostrov (December 1975–July 1980)
Major General (promoted to Lieutenant General in October 1981) Viktor Ermakov (July 1980–May 1982)
Lieutenant General Boris Tkach (May 1982–September 1984)
Lieutenant General Ivan Fuzhenko (September 1984–February 1986)
Major General (promoted to Lieutenant General in October 1987) Anatoly Sergeev (February 1986–1987)
Major General (promoted to Lieutenant General in February 1990) Gennady Yakovlev (1987–15 January 1992)
Major General Yuri Netkachev (January 15, 1992–June  27, 1992)
Major General (promoted to Lieutenant General in September 1992) Alexander Lebed (June 27, 1992–June 14, 1995)

See also
 Russian military presence in Transnistria

References

Field armies of the Soviet Union
Military units and formations established in 1956
Military units and formations disestablished in 1995
Guards Armies